Wat Phra That Phanom is a temple in the That Phanom District in the southern part of Nakhon Phanom Province, northeastern Thailand. According to legend, the temple contains Phra Uranghathat / พระอุรังคธาตุ or Phra Ura / พระอุระ   (the Buddha's breast bone) are enshrined, and as such, it is one of the most important Theravada Buddhist structures in the region.  Each year, a festival is held at That Phanom to honor the temple. The week-long festival attracts thousands of people who make pilgrimages to honor the shrine.

In Thai folk Buddhism, Wat Phra That Phanom is a popular pilgrimage destination for those born in the year of the Monkey.

The temple contains a number of paintings illustrating traditional Thai proverbs.

History

It was originally built in the 16th century by the Laotian king, Photisarath of Lan Xang.
However, according to legend, the first temple structures were built here a few years after the death of the Buddha by the five kings of the Mon kingdom, known as Sri Gotupura The chedi is said to have been built during the 10th century at a height of around eight meters. At the end of the 17th century, the chedi was restored and raised to about 47 meters. On 11 August 1975, the chedi collapsed, caused by heavy rain and strong storms for several days, but the chedi was rebuilt with funds raised by public subscription and from the Royal Thai Government, which was completed on 23 March 1979.

See also
 Phra Pathom Chedi
 Phra Mahathat Kaen Nakhon
 Phra That Kham Kaen
 Wat Pa Thama Uthayan
 Wat Thung Setthi
 Wat Photharam, Maha Sarakham

References

External links

THAT PHANOM
PLACES OF PEACE AND POWER: That Phanom, Thailand

Phra That Phanom
Phra That Phanom
16th-century Buddhist temples
Buddhist pilgrimage sites in Thailand
Thai Theravada Buddhist temples and monasteries